Wozniacki or Woźniacki (feminine: Woźniacka, plural: Woźniaccy) is a Polish-language surname related to Woźniak. It may refer to:
 Caroline Wozniacki (born 1990), Danish tennis player
 Patrik Wozniacki (born 1986), Danish footballer, brother of Caroline

See also 
 Woźniak

Polish-language surnames
Occupational surnames